is a former Japanese football player. She played for Japan national team.

Club career
Kobayashi was born in Tama on September 18, 1981. She played for Nippon TV Beleza from 1997 to 2014. In her 18 seasons, she played 223 matches in L.League. The club won L.League championship 8 times and 2nd position 10 times. She also became top scorer in 2000 season and she was selected Best Eleven in 2000 and 2001.

National team career
On March 24, 1999, when Kobayashi was 17 years old, she debuted and scored a goal for Japan national team against France. She was a member of Japan for 1999, 2003 World Cup and 2004 Summer Olympics. She also played at 2001, 2003 AFC Championship and 2002 Asian Games. She played 54 games and scored 12 goals for Japan until 2004.

National team statistics

International goals

References

External links
 

1981 births
Living people
People from Tama, Tokyo
Association football people from Tokyo Metropolis
Japanese women's footballers
Japan women's international footballers
Nadeshiko League players
Nippon TV Tokyo Verdy Beleza players
1999 FIFA Women's World Cup players
2003 FIFA Women's World Cup players
Olympic footballers of Japan
Footballers at the 2004 Summer Olympics
Asian Games medalists in football
Footballers at the 2002 Asian Games
Women's association football midfielders
Asian Games bronze medalists for Japan
Medalists at the 2002 Asian Games